Paul Babitzke is a Professor of Biochemistry and Molecular Biology and Director of the Center for RNA Molecular Biology at Pennsylvania State University.

Education 

Paul Babitzke obtained his B.A. in Biomedical Science from St. Cloud State University in Minnesota in 1994. He earned his Ph.D. in Genetics from the University of Georgia in 1991.

Career 

Before he started at Penn State University in 1994, Babitzke worked as a postdoctoral scientist at Stanford University's Department of Biological Sciences for 3 years. Currently, he is Professor of Biochemistry and Molecular Biology at Penn State.

He became an assistant professor of biochemistry and molecular biology in 1994 and associate professor in 2000. In 2006, Babitzke was promoted to full professor.

Since 2009, he has been serving as Director of the Center for RNA Molecular Biology in the Penn State Huck Institutes of the Life Sciences. His research focuses on the regulation of gene expression mediated by RNA polymerase pausing, transcription termination, RNA structure, and RNA-binding proteins.

In 2016, he was elected as Fellow of the American Association for the Advancement of Science.

In 2017, he was elected as Fellow of the American Academy of Microbiology.

Honors and awards 

Chair, Division H, American Society for Microbiology (ASM) (2006)
Chair, NIGMS Microbial Physiology and Genetics-subcommittee 2 (MBC-2) (2004)
Daniel R. Tershak Teaching Award (2009)
Divisional Group IV Representative, American Society for Microbiology (ASM) (2011-2015)
Charles E. Kaufman New Initiative Research Award (2016)
Fellow, American Association for the Advancement of Science (AAAS) (2016)
Fellow, American Academy of Microbiology (AAM) (2017)
St. Cloud State University Biological Sciences Distinguished Alumni Award (2018)

Selected publications 

Baker, C.S., Morozov, I., Suzuki, K., Romeo, T., and Babitzke, P. (2002) CsrA regulates glycogen biosynthesis by preventing translation of glgC in Escherichia coli. Mol. Microbiol. 44:1599-1610.
Yakhnin, A.V., and Babitzke, P. (2002) NusA-stimulated RNA polymerase pausing and termination participates in the Bacillus subtilis trp operon attenuation mechanism in vitro. Proc. Natl. Acad. Sci. USA. 99:11067-11072.
Yakhnin, A.V., Yakhnin, H., and Babitzke, P. (2006) RNA polymerase pausing participates in the Bacillus subtilis trpE translation control mechanism by providing additional time for TRAP to bind to the nascent trp leader transcript. Mol. Cell 24:547-557.
Yakhnin, A.V., Yakhnin, H., and Babitzke, P. (2008) Function of the Bacillus subtilis transcription elongation factor NusG in hairpin-dependent RNA polymerase pausing in the trp leader. Proc. Natl. Acad. Sci. USA 105:16131-16136.
Yakhnin, H., Yakhnin, A.V., Baker, C.S., Sineva, E., Berezin, I., Romeo, T., and Babitzke, P. (2011) Complex regulation of the global regulatory gene csrA: CsrA-mediated translational repression, transcription from five promoters by Es70 and EsS, and indirect transcriptional activation by CsrA. Mol. Microbiol. 81:689-704.
Yakhnin, A.V., Baker, C.S., Vakulskas, C.A., Yakhnin, H., Berezin, I., Romeo, T., and Babitzke, P. (2013) CsrA activates flhDC expression by protecting flhDC mRNA from RNase E-mediated cleavage. Mol. Microbiol. 87:851-866.
Mondal, S., Yakhnin, A.V., Sebastian, A., Albert, I., and Babitzke, P. (2016) NusA-dependent transcription termination prevents misregulation of global gene expression. Nat. Microbiol. 1:15007.
Potts, A.H., Vakulskas, C.A., Pannuri, A., Yakhnin, H., Babitzke, P., and Romeo, T. (2017) Global role of the bacterial post-transcriptional regulator CsrA revealed by integrated transcriptomics. Nat. Commun. 8:1596.
Yakhnin, A.V., FitzGerald, P.C., McIntosh, C., Yakhnin, H., Kireeva, M., Turek-Herman, J., Mandell, Z.F., Kashlev, M., and Babitzke, P. (2020) NusG controls transcription pausing and RNA polymerase translocation throughout the Bacillus subtilis genome. Proc. Natl. Acad. Sci. USA 117:21628-21636.
Mandell, Z.F., Oshiro, R.T., Yakhnin, A.V., Kashlev, M., Kearns, D.B., and Babitzke, P. (2021) NusG is an intrinsic transcription termination factor that stimulates motility and coordinates gene expression with NusA. eLife 10:e61880.

References

Year of birth missing (living people)
Living people
Pennsylvania State University faculty
American biochemists
American molecular biologists